"My Head & My Heart" is a song by American singer Ava Max, released on November 19, 2020, through Atlantic Records, as the eighth single from Max's debut studio album, Heaven & Hell (2020). The song was included on the digital version of the album. The dance and pop anthem was written by Max, Madison Love, Aleksey Potekhin, Sergey Zhukov, Tia Scola, Earwulf, and Cirkut, with production handled by the latter two producers and Jonas Blue. It interpolates the 2000 song "Around the World (La La La La La)" by ATC, which is an English cover of the 1998 Russian song "Pesenka" by Ruki Vverh!.

"My Head & My Heart" received generally favorable reviews from music critics, who praised the production. The song peaked at number 45 on the US Billboard Hot 100, and at number 18 on the UK Singles Chart. It is certified platinum in three countries and certified gold in four countries. An accompanying music video was directed by Charm La'Donna and Emil Nava, and depicts Max and a group of dancers performing choreography inside a nightclub. Max performed the song at several televised events.

Background and development
During the COVID-19 pandemic, Max wanted to create a song which would allow people to dance while they were at home. Development of "My Head & My Heart" occurred from September to November 2020, which she intended to release the song in the "right moment". It is the first single exclusively released for the digital edition of Max's debut studio album Heaven & Hell (2020).  It was written by Max, Madison Love, Aleksey Potekhin, Sergey Zhukov, Tia Scola, and producers Cirkut, and Earwulf. Jonas Blue was also involved in the song's production.

Composition
Musically, "My Head & My Heart" is a dance and pop anthem, which contains a heavy-layered beat with an electronic sound. According to the song's sheet music that was published on Musicnotes.com, it is set in the time signature of  common time, with a tempo of 120 beats per minute, while composed in the key of A minor. Max's voice on the track ranges from the low note of G3 to the high note of E5, while the song is constructed in verse–chorus form. "My Head & My Heart" interpolates ATC's 2000 Eurodance song "Around the World (La La La La La)", which in turn is a cover of the 1998 song "Pesenka" by Ruki Vverh!. The "Pesenka" songwriters, Zhukov and Potekhin are consequently credited as co-writers on "My Head & My Heart".

The lyrics describe a confrontation between Max and her ex-boyfriend that the former cannot get out of her head, which she subsequently "calls upon an old flame to repair her broken heart" on the sing-song hook used in "Around the World (La La La La La)". The contrast of "head" and "heart" is referred to as another form of duality, reinforcing the concept of Max's album title Heaven & Hell.

Critical reception
Writing for Billboard, Gab Ginsberg and Jason Lipshutz praised "My Head & My Heart" as a "sweaty, shimmering dance banger". Both writers acknowledged that it allowed the next generation to hear "Around the World (La La La La La)". Carolyn Droke of Uproxx stated that the song was "a thumping ode to freedom", while Mike Wass of Idolator described it as "irresistible" with a "catchy chorus". Writing for HuffPost, Curtis M. Wong noted that the song is an "exuberant, club-thumping ode to romantic conflict".

Commercial performance
In the United States, "My Head & My Heart" debuted at number 82 on the Billboard Hot 100 chart dated February 20, 2021, eventually peaking at number 45 on the chart dated March 13, 2021. The song was certified platinum by the Recording Industry Association of America (RIAA) on June 1, 2022, for sales of 1,000,000 certified units in the United States. It also reached number 13 on the Mainstream Top 40 chart dated March 20, 2021. In Canada, "My Head & My Heart" debuted at number 88 on the Canadian Hot 100 chart dated March 27, 2021, and peaked at number 21. It received a double platinum certification on April 8, 2022, for sales of 160,000 equivalent-units in the country.

In the United Kingdom, the song debuted at number 98 on the UK Singles Chart dated January 14, 2021. It peaked at number 18 on the chart dated March 26, 2021, and was certified platinum by the British Phonographic Industry (BPI) on July 15, 2022, for sales of 600,000 equivalent-units. On the Australian ARIA Singles Chart, "My Head & My Heart" peaked at number 21 on the chart dated March 8, 2021, and received a platinum certification from the Australian Recording Industry Association (ARIA) for selling over 70,000 equivalent-units in the country.

Music video
In November 2020, a lyric video of "My Head & My Heart" was released. A video for the acoustic version of the song was released on February 11, 2021. Max is seen performing with three female string musicians inside a room covered in red lighting. Her usual blonde hair is colored black, although it is still shaped as the 'Max Cut'. Andrea Dresdale of ABC News Radio noted that the visual was a "cute nod" to the song lyric, "I picture all the perfect that we lived / 'Til I cut the strings on your tiny violin". A performance video was released on February 19, 2021, which depicts British drag queen Bimini Bon-Boulash of RuPaul's Drag Race UK lip syncing the song at the Heaven superclub. The video encouraged viewers to support the charity Mermaids.

In an interview with the Hit Network on February 4, 2021, Max stated that an accompanying music video for "My Head & My Heart" was in development, which she declared as her "sexiest music video yet!". It was filmed under restrictive COVID-19 guidelines, as members on set were COVID-19 tested several times and wore masks between scenes. The music video was released on February 25, 2021, and is directed by Charm La'Donna and Emil Nava. Max acknowledged that it contrasted from her previous videos by stating that it was both "vulnerable" and "dance-inspired", as she envisioned the music video's concept while writing the song. It depicts Max and a cohort of dancers writhing, gyrating, and performing choreography inside a nightclub. She wore several outfits such as a small crop top, red mesh, glitter-covered leather, and a pair of Skechers D'Lites Biggest Fan sneakers.

Live performances
Max appeared on Jimmy Kimmel Live! to perform "My Head & My Heart" on February 25, 2021, which coincided with the release of the music video. During the performance, she navigated through a large cage while the dancers surrounded her. Max performed the song on the March 29, 2021 episode of American morning television program Good Morning America, and on the May 6, 2021 episode of The Kelly Clarkson Show. During the opening party of the Attitude Pride at Home concert on June 23, 2021, Max performed acoustic versions of the 2020 song "Kings & Queens" and "My Head & My Heart".

Track listing

Digital download / streaming – Jonas Blue remix
 "My Head & My Heart" (Jonas Blue Remix) 2:59

Digital download / streaming – Kastra remix
 "My Head & My Heart" (Kastra Remix) 2:58

Digital download / streaming – Acoustic
 "My Head & My Heart" (Acoustic) 3:11

Digital download / streaming – Claptone remix
 "My Head & My Heart (Claptone Remix) 3:02

Credits and personnel
Credits adapted from Tidal.

 Amanda Ava Koci vocals, songwriting
 Henry Walter songwriting, production, engineering, instruments, programming, vocal production
 Thomas Eriksen songwriting, production
 Jonas Blue production
 Madison Love songwriting
 Aleksey Potekhin songwriting
 Sergey Zhukov songwriting
 Tia Scola songwriting
 John Hanes engineering, mixing engineering
 Chris Gehringer mastering
 Serban Ghenea mixing

Charts

Weekly charts

Year-end charts

Certifications

Release history

References

2020 singles
2020 songs
Ava Max songs
Atlantic Records singles
Song recordings produced by Cirkut (record producer)
Songs written by Ava Max
Songs written by Cirkut (record producer)
Songs written by Madison Love